Miss Brazil 2022, officially Miss Universe Brazil 2022, is the 68th edition of the Miss Brazil pageant held on July 19, 2022 and also the second under the new Miss Universe Brazil management. Teresa Santos of Ceará crowned Mia Mamede of Espírito Santo as her successor at the end of the event. This is the first time that Espírito Santo got the title.  Mamede represented Brazil at the Miss Universe 2022 pageant, but was unplaced.

Results

Contestants
26 contestants were selected to compete.

Juries
Gustavo Aquino – Plastic surgeon
Renata Kuerten – Model and TV presenter
João Antônio – Weight loss specialist
Gabriela Mansur – Former prosecutor and woman's rights specialist
Fábio Luís de Paula – Folha de S. Paulo columnist
Ariana Lima – Photographer
Leonardo Gaspar – Psychologist
Fábio Arruda – Former reality Show participant, Etiquette and behavioral consultant

Notes

References

External links

2022 in Brazil
2022
2022 beauty pageants
Beauty pageants in Brazil
Entertainment events in Brazil
Competitions in Brazil